Insulin-like growth factor 1 (IGF-1), also called somatomedin C, is a hormone similar in molecular structure to insulin which plays an important role in childhood growth, and has anabolic effects in adults.

IGF-1 is a protein that in humans is encoded by the IGF1 gene. IGF-1 consists of 70 amino acids in a single chain with three intramolecular disulfide bridges. IGF-1 has a molecular weight of 7,649 Daltons. In dogs, an ancient mutation in IGF1 is the primary cause of the toy phenotype.

IGF-1 is produced primarily by the liver. Production is stimulated by growth hormone (GH). Most of IGF-1 is bound to one of 6 binding proteins (IGF-BP). IGFBP-1 is regulated by insulin. IGF-1 is produced throughout life; the highest rates of IGF-1 production occur during the pubertal growth spurt. The lowest levels occur in infancy and old age.

A synthetic analog of IGF-1, mecasermin, is used in children for the treatment of growth failure.

Cyclic glycine-proline (cGP) is metabolite of hormone insulin-like growth factor-1 (IGF-1). It has a cyclic structure, lipophilic nature, and is enzymatically stable which makes its a more favourable candidate for manipulating the binding-release process between IGF-1 and its binding protein thereby, normalising IGF-1 function.

Synthesis and circulation 

IGF-1 is produced primarily by the liver as an endocrine hormone as well as in target tissues in a paracrine/autocrine fashion. Production is stimulated by growth hormone (GH) and can be retarded by undernutrition, growth hormone insensitivity, lack of growth hormone receptors, or failures of the downstream signaling pathway post GH receptor including SHP2 and STAT5B. Approximately 98% of IGF-1 is always bound to one of 6 binding proteins (IGF-BP). IGFBP-3, the most abundant protein, accounts for 80% of all IGF binding. IGF-1 binds to IGFBP-3 in a 1:1 molar ratio. IGFBP-1 is regulated by insulin.

IGF-1 is produced throughout life. The highest rates of IGF-1 production occur during the pubertal growth spurt. The lowest levels occur in infancy and old age.

Protein intake increases IGF-1 levels in humans, independent of total calorie consumption. Factors that are known to cause variation in the levels of growth hormone (GH) and IGF-1 in the circulation include: insulin levels, genetic make-up, the time of day, age, sex, exercise status, stress levels, nutrition level and body mass index (BMI), disease state, ethnicity, estrogen status and xenobiotic intake.

Mechanism of action 

IGF-1 is a primary mediator of the effects of growth hormone (GH). Growth hormone is made in the anterior pituitary gland, is released into the blood stream, and then stimulates the liver to produce IGF-1. IGF-1 then stimulates systemic body growth, and has growth-promoting effects on almost every cell in the body, especially skeletal muscle, cartilage, bone, liver, kidney, nerve, skin, hematopoietic, and lung cells. In addition to the insulin-like effects, IGF-1 can also regulate cellular DNA synthesis.

IGF-1 binds to at least two cell surface receptor tyrosine kinases: the IGF-1 receptor (IGF1R), and the insulin receptor. Its primary action is mediated by binding to its specific receptor, IGF1R, which is present on the surface of many cell types in many tissues. Binding to the IGF1R initiates intracellular signaling. IGF-1 is one of the most potent natural activators of the AKT signaling pathway, a stimulator of cell growth and proliferation, and a potent inhibitor of programmed cell death . The IGF-1 receptor seems to be the "physiologic" receptor because it binds IGF-1 with significantly higher affinity than insulin receptor does. IGF-1 activates the insulin receptor at approximately 0.1 times the potency of insulin. Part of this signaling may be via IGF1R/Insulin Receptor heterodimers (the reason for the confusion is that binding studies show that IGF1 binds the insulin receptor 100-fold less well than insulin, yet that does not correlate with the actual potency of IGF1 in vivo at inducing phosphorylation of the insulin receptor, and hypoglycemia).

IGF-1 binds and activates its own receptor, IGF-1R, through the cell surface expression of Receptor Tyrosine Kinase's (RTK's) and further signal through multiple intracellular transduction cascades. IGF-1R is the critical role-playing inducer in modulating the metabolic effects of IGF-1 for cellular senescence and survival. At a localized target cell, IGF-1R elicits the mediation of paracrine activity. After its activation the initiation of intracellular signaling occurs inducing a magnitude of signaling pathways. An important mechanistic pathway involved in mediating a cascade affect a key pathway regulated by phosphatidylinositol-3 kinase (PI3K) and its downstream partner, mTOR (mammalian Target of Rapamycin). Rapamycin binds with the enzyme FKBPP12 to inhibit the mTORC1 complex. mTORC2 remains unaffected and responds by up-regulating AKT, driving signals through the inhibited mTORC1. Phosphorylation of Eukaryotic translation initiation factor 4E (EIF4E) by mTOR suppresses the capacity of Eukaryotic translation initiation factor 4E-binding protein 1 (EIF4EBP1) to inhibit EIF4E and slow metabolism. A mutation in the signaling pathway PI3K-AKT-mTOR is a big factor in the formation of tumors found predominantly on skin, internal organs, and secondary lymph nodes (Kaposi sarcoma). IGF-1R allows the activation of these signaling pathways and subsequently regulates the cellular longevity and metabolic re-uptake of biogenic substances. A therapeutic approach targeting towards the reduction of such tumor collections could be induced by ganitumab. Ganitumab is a monoclonal antibody (mAb) directed antagonistically against IGF-1R. Ganitumab binds to IGF-1R, preventing binding of IGF-1 and the subsequent triggering of the PI3K-mTOR signaling pathway; inhibition of this pro-survival pathway may result in the inhibition of tumor cell expansion and the induction of tumor cell apoptosis.

Insulin-like growth factor 1 has been shown to bind and interact with all seven IGF-1 binding proteins (IGFBPs): IGFBP1, IGFBP2, IGFBP3, IGFBP4, IGFBP5, IGFBP6, and IGFBP7.
Some IGFBPs are inhibitory. For example, both IGFBP-2 and IGFBP-5 bind IGF-1 at a higher affinity than it binds its receptor. Therefore, increases in serum levels of these two IGFBPs result in a decrease in IGF-1 activity.

Metabolic effects 

As a major growth factor, IGF-1 is responsible for stimulating growth of all cell types and causing significant metabolic effects. One important metabolic effect of IGF-1 is its ability to signal cells that sufficient nutrients are available for cells to undergo hypertrophy and cell division. These signals also enable IGF-1 to inhibit cell apoptosis and increase the production of cellular proteins. IGF-1 receptors are ubiquitous, which allows for metabolic changes caused by IGF-1 to occur in all cell types. IGF-1's metabolic effects are far-reaching and can coordinate protein, carbohydrate, and fat metabolism in a variety of different cell types. The regulation of IGF-1's metabolic effects on target tissues is also coordinated with other hormones such as growth hormone and insulin.

Related growth factors 

IGF-1 is closely related to a second protein called "IGF-2". IGF-2 also binds the IGF-1 receptor. However, IGF-2 alone binds a receptor called the "IGF-2 receptor" (also called the mannose-6 phosphate receptor). The insulin-like growth factor-II receptor (IGF2R) lacks signal transduction capacity, and its main role is to act as a sink for IGF-2 and make less IGF-2 available for binding with IGF-1R.
As the name "insulin-like growth factor 1" implies, IGF-1 is structurally related to insulin, and is even capable of binding the insulin receptor, albeit at lower affinity than insulin.

A splice variant of IGF-1 sharing an identical mature region, but with a different E domain is known as mechano-growth factor (MGF).

Disorders

Laron dwarfism 

Patients with severe primary insulin-like growth factor-1 deficiency (IGFD), called Laron syndrome, may be treated with either IGF-1 alone or in combination with IGFBP-3. Mecasermin (brand name Increlex) is a synthetic analog of IGF-1 which is approved for the treatment of growth failure. 

Rare diseases characterized by inability to make or respond to IGF-1 produce a distinctive type of growth failure. One such disorder, termed Laron dwarfism does not respond at all to growth hormone treatment due to a lack of GH receptors. The FDA has grouped these diseases into a disorder called severe primary IGF deficiency. Patients with severe primary IGFD typically present with normal to high GH levels, height below 3 standard deviations (SD), and IGF-1 levels below 3 SD. Severe primary IGFD includes patients with mutations in the GH receptor, post-receptor mutations or IGF mutations, as previously described. As a result, these patients cannot be expected to respond to GH treatment.

People with Laron syndrome have very low rates of cancer and diabetes. Notably people with untreated Laron syndrome also never develop acne.

Acromegaly 

Acromegaly is a syndrome that results when the anterior pituitary gland produces excess growth hormone (GH). A number of disorders may increase the pituitary's GH output, although most commonly it involves a tumor called pituitary adenoma, derived from a distinct type of cell (somatotrophs). It leads to anatomical changes and metabolic dysfunction caused by both an elevated GH and elevated IGF-1 levels. High level of IGF-1 in acromegaly is related to an increased risk of some cancers, particularly colon cancer and thyroid cancer.

Cancer 

A mutation in the signalling pathway PI3K-AKT-mTOR is a factor in the formation of tumors found predominantly on skin, internal organs, and secondary lymph nodes (Kaposi sarcoma).

Use as a diagnostic test 

IGF-1 levels can be measured in the blood in 10-1000 ng/ml amounts. As levels do not fluctuate greatly throughout the day for an individual person, IGF-1 is used by physicians as a screening test for growth hormone deficiency and excess in acromegaly and gigantism.

Interpretation of IGF-1 levels is complicated by the wide normal ranges, and marked variations by age, sex, and pubertal stage. Clinically significant conditions and changes may be masked by the wide normal ranges. Sequential measurement over time is often useful for the management of several types of pituitary disease, undernutrition, and growth problems.

Causes of elevated IGF-1 levels 

 acromegaly (especially when GH is also high)
high-protein diet
high glycemic-index diet
dairy products (except for cheese) consumption
 delayed puberty
 pregnancy
 hyperthyroidism
 IGF-1 assay problems
 some rare tumors (i.e. carcinoids) secreting IGF-1

Health effects

Cancer

It has been suggested that consumption of IGF-1 in dairy products could increase cancer risk, particularly prostate cancer. However, a 2018 review by the Committee on Carcinogenicity of Chemicals in Food, Consumer Products and the Environment (COC) concluded that there is "insufficient evidence to draw any firm conclusions as to whether exposure to dietary IGF-1 is associated with an increased incidence of cancer in consumers". Certain dairy processes such as fermentation are known to significantly decrease IGF-1 concentrations.

Mortality

A 2022 review found that both high and low levels of IGF‐1 increase mortality risk, whilst a mid‐range (120–160 ng/ml) is associated with the lowest mortality.

Other

Increased IGF-1 levels are associated with a lower risk of cardiovascular disease and ischaemic stroke.

Clinical trials

Recombinant protein 

Several companies have evaluated administering recombinant IGF-1 in clinical trials for type 1 diabetes, type 2 diabetes, amyotrophic lateral sclerosis, severe burn injury and myotonic muscular dystrophy.

Results of clinical trials evaluating the efficacy of IGF-1 in type 1 diabetes and type 2 diabetes showed reduction in hemoglobin A1C levels and daily insulin consumption. However the sponsor discontinued the program due to an exacerbation of diabetic retinopathy, coupled with a shift in corporate focus towards oncology.

Two clinical studies of IGF-1 for ALS were conducted and although one study demonstrated efficacy the second was equivocal, and the product was not submitted for approval to the FDA.

History of name
In the 1950s IGF-1 was called "sulfation factor" because it stimulated sulfation of cartilage in vitro, and in the 1970s due to its effects it was termed "nonsuppressible insulin-like activity" (NSILA).

See also 
 Somatopause

References

External links 
 
 

Peptide hormones
Growth factors
Hormones of the somatotropic axis
Insulin-like growth factor receptor agonists
Insulin receptor agonists
Aging-related proteins
Neurotrophic factors
Developmental neuroscience
World Anti-Doping Agency prohibited substances